The 2017 Cronulla-Sutherland Sharks season was the 51st in the club's history. Coached by Shane Flanagan and captained by Paul Gallen, they competed in the National Rugby League's 2017 Telstra Premiership.

Important Matches

Round 1 : Jayden Brailey, NRL Debut
Round 1 : Edrick Lee, Club Debut
Round 3 : James Segeyaro, Club Debut
Round 5 : Chris Heighington, 300th NRL Match
Round 6 : Chris Heighington, 100th Cronulla Sutherland Sharks Match
Round 9 : Tony Williams, Club Debut
Round 15 : Daniel Mortimer, Club Debut
Round 16 : Sosaia Feki, 100th NRL Match
Round 20 : Luke Lewis, 300th NRL Match
Round 23 : Paul Gallen, 300th NRL Match
Round 24 : James Maloney, 200th NRL Match
Round 24 : Ricky Leutele, 100th NRL Match
Round 25 : Wade Graham, 200th NRL Match
Round 26 : Matt Prior, 200th NRL Match
Round 26 : Jesse Ramien, NRL Debut

Ladder

Results

 Round 1 - Cronulla Sharks vs Brisbane Broncos (18 - 26)
Tries: Gerard Beale, James Maloney, Ricky Leutele

 Round 2 - Canberra Raiders vs Cronulla Sharks (16 - 42)
Tries: Wade Graham (3), Ricky Leutele, Jayden Brailey, Matt Prior, Paul Gallen

 Round 3 - Cronulla Sharks vs St George Illawarra Dragons (10 - 16)
Tries: Luke Lewis, Edrick Lee

 Round 4 - Parramatta Eels vs Cronulla Sharks (6 - 20)
Tries: Jayden Brailey, Sosaia Feki, James Maloney

 Round 5 - Cronulla Sharks vs Newcastle Knights (19 - 18)
Tries: Gerard Beale, Sosaia Feki, Valentine Holmes

Field Goal: James Maloney

 Round 6 - Melbourne Storm vs Cronulla Sharks (2 - 11)
Tries: James Segeyaro

Field Goal: James Maloney

 Round 7 - Penrith Panthers vs Cronulla Sharks (2 - 28)
Tries: James Maloney, Sosaia Feki, Jack Bird, Paul Gallen, Andrew Fifita

 Round 8 - Cronulla Sharks vs Gold Coast Titans (12 - 16)
Tries: Ricky Leutele, Jayson Bukuya

 Round 9 - Wests Tigers vs Cronulla Sharks (16 - 22)
Tries: Tony Williams, Sosaia Feki, Valentine Holmes, Chad Townsend

 Round 10 - St George Illawarra Dragons vs Cronulla Sharks (14 - 18)
Tries: Sosaia Feki (2), Ricky Leutele

 Round 11 - Cronulla Sharks vs North Queensland Cowboys (18 - 14)
Tries: James Maloney, Chad Townsend, Sosaia Feki

 Round 12 - Cronulla Sharks vs Canterbury Bankstown Bulldogs (9 - 8)
Tries: Gerard Beale

Field Goal: Chad Townsend

 Round 14 - Cronulla Sharks vs Melbourne Storm (13 - 18)
Tries Luke Lewis, Sosaia Feki

 Round 15 - Cronulla Sharks vs Wests Tigers (24 - 22)
Tries: Kurt Capewell (2), Chad Townsend, Edrick Lee, Jayson Bukuya

 Round 16 - Cronulla Sharks vs Manly Sea Eagles (18 - 35)
Tries: Luke Lewis, Sosaia Feki, Wade Graham

 Round 17 - Sydney Roosters vs Cronulla Sharks (12 - 44)
Tries: Ricky Leutele (2), Jack Bird, Valentine Holmes, Sosaia Feki, Luke Lewis, Gerard Beale

 Round 19 - Gold Coast Titans vs Cronulla Sharks (30 - 10)
Tries: Kurt Capewell, Sosaia Feki

 Round 20 - Cronulla Sharks vs South Sydney Rabbitohs (26 - 12)
Tries: Wade Graham, Fa'amanu Brown, Gerard Beale, Ricky Leutele

 Round 21 - New Zealand Warriors vs Cronulla Sharks (12 - 26)
Tries: Kurt Capewell, Fa'amanu Brown, Sosaia Feki, Jayson Bukuya

 Round 22 - Cronulla Sharks vs Canberra Raiders (12 - 30)
Tries: Sosaia Feki, Gerard Beale

 Round 23 - Brisbane Broncos vs Cronulla Sharks (10-32)
Tries: Luke Lewis, Gerard Beale

 Round 24 - North Queensland Cowboys vs Cronulla Sharks (16 - 26)
Tries: Jayden Brailey, Paul Gallen, Chad Townsend, Valentine Holmes

 Round 25 - Cronulla Sharks vs Sydney Roosters (14 - 16)
Tries: Valentine Holmes, Luke Lewis

 Round 26 - Newcastle Knights vs Cronulla Sharks (18 - 26)
Tries: Valentine Holmes, Chad Townsend, Jayden Brailey, Jesse Ramien

 Finals Week 1 - Cronulla Sharks vs North Queensland Cowboys (14 - 15)
Tries: Chad Townsend, Jack Bird

References

Cronulla-Sutherland Sharks seasons
Cronulla-Sutherland Sharks season